Dong Shaoming (born October 1962) is a Chinese engineer who is a researcher at the Shanghai Institute of Ceramics, Chinese Academy of Sciences.

Biography
Dong was born in October 1962 in Laizhou, Shandong. He received his bachelor's degree and master's degree from South China Institute of Technology (now South China University of Technology) in 1984 and 1987 both in inorganic nonmetallic materials. He obtained his doctor's degree from the Shanghai Institute of Ceramics, Chinese Academy of Sciences in 1996. After graduation, he joined the faculty of Shandong Building Materials College (now Jinan University). He was a senior visiting scholar/visiting researcher at the University of Bordeaux (1998–1999), Kyoto University (1999–2002), and Korea Institute of Machinery and Materials (April 2002–July 2002). He returned to China in 2002 and that same year joined the Shanghai Institute of Ceramics, Chinese Academy of Sciences.

Honours and awards
 2012 ASM-IIM Lecturer
 2013 State Technological Invention Award (Second Class)  
 2013 Fellow of the World Academy of Ceramics
 2013 Global Star Award
 November 22, 2019 Member of the Chinese Academy of Engineering (CAE)

References

External links
Dong Shaoming on the Shanghai Institute of Ceramics, Chinese Academy of Sciences  

1957 births
Living people
People from Yantai
Engineers from Shandong
South China University of Technology alumni
Members of the Chinese Academy of Engineering